The Games Convention (GC), sometimes called the Leipzig Games Convention,  was an annual video game event held in Leipzig, Germany, first held in 2002. Besides video games, the event also covers Infotainment, Hardware, and Edutainment. Its concept was created by the Leipziger Messe (Leipzig Fair) in cooperation with Bundesverband für Interaktive Unterhaltungssoftware (German Federal Association for Entertainment Software) amongst others.  The 2010 Gamescon was held August 18 to August 22.

With 183,000 visitors, 2,600 journalists, and 368 exhibitors from 25 countries in 2006, the Games Convention was the second biggest gaming event in the world, together with the Tokyo Game Show, later only superseded by Gamescom, which is also held in Germany. By comparison, both the Leipzig and Tokyo shows, where gamers of all ages could visit the show floor, are three times the size of the trade-only 2006 E3 show in Los Angeles. The Business Centre at Leipzig was reserved for professional visitors. In 2008, the Games Convention had a record of 203,000 visitors. The conference took place in a sprawling modern complex of exhibition halls in Leipzig.

To help identify younger visitors, coloured bracelets were handed out to attendees, indicating their age: "12 years and older" (green), "16 years and older" (blue), and "18 years and older" (red). These colours corresponded to the age indicators used by the USK, the German version of PEGI or ESRB.

In April 2011, it was announced that GCO 2011 would not take place.

History 

The Leipzig Games Convention was first held in 2002. In 2005, the convention achieved visitor numbers of 134,000, which had risen to 185,000 by 2007.

The Games Convention was usually held in the last week of August. The Games Convention 2007 took place from 23 August to 26 August 2007. It started one day earlier for press members, exhibitors, and professionals.

In 2008, the Industry consortium BIU announced not to back a Games Convention in 2009 in Leipzig, preferring a newly to be established convention held in Cologne under the name of Gamescom. Sony, Nintendo, and Microsoft are members of the BIU, representing 12 companies.

On 29 January 2009, the Leipziger Messe (Leipzig Fair) announced that in 2009 there would be no Games Convention as in 2008, but a new fair called "Games Convention Online" from 31 July to 2 August 2009. It featured mainly browser games and other online and casual games.

Asian expansion 
An Asian edition of the Games Convention, called Games Convention Asia was first held in 2007. It was a yearly convention held in Singapore, starting on 6 September 2007. However, it has since become defunct as of 2010 when it was officially announced that the convention would no longer be held.

Statistics

Games Convention

Games Convention Online

International Games Convention Developers Conference 
The Games Convention Developers Conference (GCDC) was the largest game design and development conference in Europe, with 950 attendees in 2008.

The GCDC was held in a building in the same complex in Leipzig where the GC took place, typically just before the opening of the main show. During the conference attendees gained ideas and inspiration from the presentation of new tools and methods, and from a variety of sessions discussing both the craft and the business of game design and development. The conference was open to both game professionals, students and press.

As the major European conference, GCDC drew top speakers from all over the world. Presenters in recent years included Bob Bates, Louis Castle, Don Daglow, Peter Molyneux, Bill Roper, Bruce Shelley, David Perry and Will Wright.

Speakers

2007 
Notable speakers from the GCDC 2007.

 Julian Eggebrecht, from Factor 5, United States
 Peter Molyneux, from Lionhead Studios, England
 Michael Capps, Mark Rein from Epic Games, United States
 Mark Morris, from Introversion Software, England
 Ken Rolston, from Big Huge Games, United States
 Cathy Campos, from Panache, England
 Doug Whatley, from BreakAway, United States
 Michael Lewis, from Cryptic Studios, United States
 George Bain, England
 Christopher Schmitz, from 10Tacle Studios, Germany
 Michael Wimmer, from The University of Vienna, Austria
 Alexander Fernández, from Streamline Studios, Netherlands
 Amir Taaki, from Crystal Space, England
 Jeff Strain, from ArenaNet, United States
 Vlad Ihora, from Telia Sonera, Sweden
 Barbara Lippe, from Avaloop, Austria
 Pamela Kato, from The GamerX, United States
 Uwe Nikl, from Level 3, England
 Matt Firor, from Ultra Mega Games, United States
 Konstantin Ewald, from Osborne Clark, Germany
 John Smedley, from Sony Online Entertainment, United States
 Cindy Armstrong, from Webzen, United States
 Jennifer MacLean, from Comcast Interactive Media, United States
 Chris Mottes, from Deadline Games, Denmark
 Jeff Hickman, from EA Mythic, United States
 Jeffrey Steefel, from Turbine, Inc., United States
 Don Daglow, from Stormfront Studios, United States
 Matt Firor from the United States
 Jason Manley, from Massive Black, United States
 Patric Palm, from Hansoft, Sweden
 Jonathan Wendel, from Fata1ity, United States

2008 
 David Perry, from Acclaim Games, United States
 Cevat Yerli, from Crytek, Germany
 Mike Capps, from Epic Games, United States
 Paul Barnett, from Mythic Entertainment, United States

Press day and press conferences 
The Games Convention opened for professional visitors, such as developers and members of the press, one day before the event opened to the public. Many developers and publishers held official press conferences on this day.

Symphonic Game Music Concert 

As part of the Games Convention, on the evening of the first day of the Games Convention, a grand Symphonic Game Music Concert was held in the Leipzig Gewandhaus. Well-known game music composers such as Nobuo Uematsu, Michiru Yamane, Akira Yamaoka, Jason Hayes, Rob Hubbard, Chris Hülsbeck and Yuzo Koshiro were among those who have attended.

European Nations Championship

The European Nations Championship has taken place since 2004. It is a national team competition, where it determines which European nation has the best e-athletes. The ENC holds events in Counter-Strike, Counter-Strike: Source, Warcraft III, FIFA, Call of Duty 4, and DotA. The final takes place every year in August at the Games Convention in Leipzig, Germany.

See also 
 Leipziger Messe
 Gamescom
 Tokyo Game Show
 Brasil Game Show
 Gamercom
 E3
 Penny Arcade Expo
 Entertainment for All

References

External links 
Official website of the Games Convention
Games Convention Developer Conference
Site of the Symphonic Game Music Concerts
Leipziger Messe
Games Convention Asia official website
Video Games Convention 23 August 2008 in Leipzig, Germany.

External links 

Roads lead to Singapore in September for videogame industry
Suggested CICC events
Gamasutra.com: Games Convention Asia 2007 Details Revealed
Heise.de: Facts about the Games Convention 2007 (german)

Recurring events established in 2002
Defunct gaming conventions
Trade fairs in Germany
2002 establishments in Germany